Lindhorst is a railway station located in Lindhorst, Germany. The station is located on the Hannover to Minden railway. The train services are operated by Deutsche Bahn as part of the Hanover S-Bahn. Lindhorst is served by the S1.

Train services
The following services currently call at Lindhorst:

References

Railway stations in Lower Saxony
Hannover S-Bahn stations